Anita Jane Brody (née Blumstein; born May 25, 1935), also known as Anita Blumstein Brody, is a senior United States district judge of the United States District Court for the Eastern District of Pennsylvania.

Education and career

Brody was born in Brooklyn, New York. She earned a Bachelor of Arts degree from Wellesley College in 1955, and a Juris Doctor from Columbia Law School in 1958. Brody was a deputy assistant state attorney general in New York from 1958 to 1959. From 1973 to 1981 she was in private practice in Philadelphia. In 1981 Brody was appointed by Pennsylvania Governor Richard Thornburgh, and then elected a Judge of the Court of Common Pleas for Montgomery County, Pennsylvania, which is part of the Philadelphia Metropolitan Area.

Federal judicial service

Brody was nominated by President George H. W. Bush on November 22, 1991, to the United States District Court for the Eastern District of Pennsylvania, to a new seat created as a result of the passage of 104 Stat. 5089. She was confirmed by the United States Senate on September 2, 1992, and received her commission on October 2, 1992.

Notable case

Brody presided over the case to decide whether a group of lawsuits by former NFL players against the NFL would be heard in federal court or whether the cases would be heard by an arbitrator in accordance with the league's collective bargaining agreement, as the league has requested. In an April 9, 2013 hearing, the NFL's lawyer, Paul Clement, admitted it would be difficult for the NFL to make the argument that an arbitrator should hear the cases of former players who never signed the collective bargaining agreement. The medical condition chronic traumatic encephalopathy (sometimes referred to simply as CTE) resulting from concussions is a factor in the suits.

References

Sources
 

1935 births
Living people
Columbia Law School alumni
Judges of the Pennsylvania Courts of Common Pleas
Judges of the United States District Court for the Eastern District of Pennsylvania
United States district court judges appointed by George H. W. Bush
20th-century American judges
People from Brooklyn
Wellesley College alumni
21st-century American judges
20th-century American women judges
21st-century American women judges